The Pacific War Trilogy is a three-volume history of the war in the Pacific, written by best selling author and military historian Ian W. Toll. The series was published by W. W. Norton & Company. Toll is a graduate of St George's School in Middletown, Rhode Island. In 1989, he received an undergraduate degree in American history from Georgetown University; in 1995 he received a master's degree in public policy from Harvard Kennedy School at Harvard University.

Book series

The Pacific Crucible
Pacific Crucible: War at Sea in the Pacific, 19411942 is the first volume in the Pacific War trilogy. The book is a narrative history of the opening phase of the Pacific War, which took place in the eastern Pacific between the Allies and the Empire of Japan. It was published by W. W. Norton & Company in 2011 (hardcover and Kindle) and 2012 (paperback). It was released as an audiobook narrated by Grover Gardner by Audible Studios in 2011. The book was the winner of the Northern California Book Award for Nonfiction in 2012.

 640 pp. (hardcover) ; Pacific Crucible at W. W. Norton.
 22 hrs and 6 mins (audiobook); Pacific Crucible at Audible Studios.

The Conquering Tide
The Conquering Tide: War in the Pacific Islands, 19421944 is the second volume in the Pacific War trilogy. The book is a narrative history of the middle phase of the Pacific War, which took place in the central and southern Pacific between the Allies and the Empire of Japan. It was published by W. W. Norton & Company in 2015 (hardcover and Kindle) and 2016 (paperback). It was released as an audiobook narrated by P. J. Ochlan by Recorded Books in 2015. The book was a New York Times best selling non-fiction book.

 656 pp. (hardcover), ; The Conquering Tide at W. W. Norton.
 27 hours and 22 minutes (audiobook); The Conquering Tide at Recorded Books.

Twilight of the Gods
Twilight of the Gods: War in the Western Pacific, 19441945 is the third and final volume in the Pacific War trilogy written by best selling author and historian Ian W. Toll. The book is a narrative history of the final phase of the Pacific War, that took place in the western Pacific between the Allies and the Empire of Japan. It was published by W. W. Norton & Company in 2020 (hardcover and Kindle). It was also released as an audiobook narrated by P. J. Ochlan by Recorded Books in 2020.<ref name="nyt2">{{cite web |url=https://www.nytimes.com/2020/08/28/books/review/twilight-of-the-gods-ian-w-toll.html |title=How the U.S. Won the War Against Japan: Book Review of Twilight of the Gods |author=Perry, M. |date=August 28, 2020 |website=The New York Times |access-date=September 19, 2020 }}</ref> The book was a New York Times best selling non-fiction book.

 944 pp. (hardcover), ; Twilight of the Gods at W. W. Norton.
 36 hours and 46 minutes (audiobook); Twilight of the Gods at Recorded Books.

See also
Asiatic-Pacific Theater
Greater East Asia Co-Prosperity Sphere
Imperial Japanese Army
Imperial Japanese Navy
Pacific Ocean theater of World War II
Southern Expeditionary Army Group
South West Pacific Area (command)
Composition of the Pacific Fleet in December 1941

References

Further reading
Beevor, A. (2014). The Second World War. London: Orion.
Hastings, M. (2011). Inferno: The World at War, 1939–1945. New York: Alfred A. Knopf.
Morison, S. E. (2001). History of United States Naval Operations in World War II (15 Volumes). The United States Navy's official history of World War Two.
Roberts, A. (2011). The Storm of War: A New History of the Second World War''. New York: HarperCollins.

2011 non-fiction books
2015 non-fiction books
2020 non-fiction books
History books about Japan
History books about the United States
History books about World War II
Military history of the Pacific Ocean
 
Pacific theatre of World War II
Military history